Robert or Bob Harper may refer to:

 Robert Almer Harper (1862–1946), American botanist
 Robert Goodloe Harper (1765–1825), US senator from Maryland
 Robert Harper (fl. 1734–1761), founder of Harpers Ferry, West Virginia
 Robert Harper (actor) (1951–2020), American actor
 Robert Harper (Australian politician) (1842–1919), member of the Australian House of Representatives
 Robert Harper (computer scientist) (born 1957), computer science professor at Carnegie Mellon University
 Robert Harper (conveyancer) (1700–1772), English conveyancer and drafter of parliamentary bills
 Robert Harper (cricketer) (born 1948), South African cricketer
 Robert Newton Harper (1861–1940), president of the District of Columbia Pharmaceutical Association
 Bob Harper (Ontario politician)
 Bob Harper (personal trainer) (born 1965), American personal trainer and author
 Bob Harper (politician) (1944–2017), Australian politician
 Bob Harper (producer) (born 1955), Hollywood film producer
 Robert Harper (cave rescue expert), cave expert
 Bobby Ball (1944–2020), British Comedian, born Robert Harper